Nong Boua may refer to several villages in Laos:

Nong Boua, Bolikhamsai
Nong Boua, Khammouane
Nong Boua, Vientiane